Morimopsis dalihodi is a species of beetle in the family Cerambycidae. It was described by Holzschuh in 2003.

References

Morimopsini
Beetles described in 2003